The Baltimore and Drum Point Railroad is a ghost railroad planned to connect eastern Maryland, the city of Baltimore and the port at Drum Point, Maryland. First conceived in 1856 and chartered in 1868, work didn't begin until 1873 but was halted a year later by the Panic of 1873. Work began again in 1888, and by 1891, 25 of the 34 miles had been prepared for tracks, trestles were constructed across the St. Leonard's and Hunting Creeks, locally cut railroad ties were in place and 8000 tons of steel rails were on their way from Pittsburgh. But the project was halted again when citizens of Anne Arundel County successfully sued to cancel the funding. They won on a technicality as the bond issue referendum to finance it was advertised for only 59 days rather than the requisite 60 days.

Other efforts were made to restart the project with the last coming in 1924, but by then four railroads were already operating in the area and were under significant pressure due to the advent of highways and cars.

References

Rail transportation in Maryland
Railway companies established in 1868
Railway companies disestablished in 1891